This article is about the particular significance of the year 1872 to Wales and its people.

Incumbents

Lord Lieutenant of Anglesey – William Owen Stanley 
Lord Lieutenant of Brecknockshire – Charles Morgan, 1st Baron Tredegar
Lord Lieutenant of Caernarvonshire – Edward Douglas-Pennant, 1st Baron Penrhyn 
Lord Lieutenant of Cardiganshire – Edward Pryse
Lord Lieutenant of Carmarthenshire – John Campbell, 2nd Earl Cawdor 
Lord Lieutenant of Denbighshire – Robert Myddelton Biddulph (until 21 March); William Cornwallis-West (from 5 June)   
Lord Lieutenant of Flintshire – Sir Stephen Glynne, 9th Baronet 
Lord Lieutenant of Glamorgan – Christopher Rice Mansel Talbot 
Lord Lieutenant of Merionethshire – Edward Lloyd-Mostyn, 2nd Baron Mostyn
Lord Lieutenant of Monmouthshire – Henry Somerset, 8th Duke of Beaufort
Lord Lieutenant of Montgomeryshire – Sudeley Hanbury-Tracy, 3rd Baron Sudeley
Lord Lieutenant of Pembrokeshire – William Edwardes, 3rd Baron Kensington (until 1 January);  William Edwardes, 4th Baron Kensington (from 6 February)
Lord Lieutenant of Radnorshire – John Walsh, 1st Baron Ormathwaite

Bishop of Bangor – James Colquhoun Campbell
Bishop of Llandaff – Alfred Ollivant 
Bishop of St Asaph – Joshua Hughes 
Bishop of St Davids – Connop Thirlwall

Events
5 January — In a mining accident at Blackwood Colliery, five men are killed.
2 March — In a mining accident at Victoria Colliery, Ebbw Vale, nineteen men are killed.
18 June — A derailment occurs in the Pencader Tunnel on the Carmarthen & Cardigan Railway.
12 July — Cardiff Tramways Company begins operation of horse trams.
15 July — The Colwyn Bay Hotel is opened.
1 August — Minffordd railway station is opened.
9 October — University College Wales, Aberystwyth, opens with 26 students; Thomas Charles Edwards is its first principal.
unknown dates
Stocks are used on the last recorded occasion in the UK, at Adpar in Cardiganshire, when a man is imprisoned in them for drunkenness.
Nitrocellulose manufacture at Penrhyndeudraeth begins.

Arts and literature

New books
R. D. Blackmore — The Maid of Sker
Thomas Thomas — Hynodion Hen Bregethwyr Cymru

Music
The South Wales "Cor Mawr", conducted by Griffith R. Jones (Caradog) wins a national choral competition at Crystal Palace.

Sport
Cricket — First game played at Elwy Grove Park, St Asaph.
Football — 28 September: Wrexham Football Club is founded. They play at the Racecourse Ground.

Births
21 February — Evan Lorimer Thomas, clergyman and academic (died 1953)
16 March — Vernon Hartshorn, politician (died 1931)
6 May — William Llewellyn Thomas, Wales international rugby player (died 1943)
10 May — Tom Pearson, Wales international rugby player (died 1957)
18 May — Bertrand Russell, philosopher (died 1970)
14 July — David Morgan, Wales international rugby player (died 1933)
14 September — Albert Jenkin, Wales international rugby player (died 1961)
8 October — John Cowper Powys, Anglo-Welsh writer (died 1963)
date unknown — Thomas Jeremiah Williams, lawyer and politician (died 1919)

Deaths
1 January — William Edwardes, 3rd Baron Kensington, Lord Lieutenant of Pembrokeshire, 70
9 January — Crawshay Bailey, industrialist
21 March — Robert Myddelton Biddulph, landowner and politician, 66
24 March — James Williams, clergyman and philanthropist, 81
13 April — Thomas Vowler Short, Bishop of St Asaph
3 August — William Davies Evans, chess player, 82
18 August — Evan Jones, missionary, 84
22 August — Evan Davies, educator, 84
26 September — William Williams (Carw Coch), poet
28 September — Lleyson Hopkin Davy, government representative, brewer and industrialist, 89/90
16 October — David Lewis, MP for Carmarthen, 75
11 November — Mary Anne Disraeli, wife of British prime minister Benjamin Disraeli, 80

References

Wales